Qezel Hesar (also Romanized as Qezel Ḥeṣār and Ghezel Ḥeṣār; also known as Ghiral Hisār) is a village in Mohammadabad Rural District, in the Central District of Karaj County, Alborz Province, Iran. At the 2006 census, its population was 807, in 208 families.  
Ghezel Hesar prison is a large state prison.

References 

Populated places in Karaj County